Taylor Rae Rehfeldt is an American politician and registered nurse anesthesiologist serving as a member of the South Dakota House of Representatives from the 14th district. Elected in November 2020, she assumed office on January 12, 2021.

Education 
Rehfeldt earned a Bachelor of Science in Nursing from South Dakota State University, a Bachelor of Science in interdisciplinary science from the South Dakota School of Mines and Technology, and a Master of Science and Doctor of Nursing Practice in nurse anesthesia from Mount Marty University.

Career 
Prior to entering politics, Rehfeldt worked as a nurse anesthesiologist. She was elected to the South Dakota House of Representatives in November 2020 and assumed office on January 11, 2021.

References 

Living people
South Dakota State University alumni
South Dakota School of Mines and Technology alumni
Mount Marty College alumni
Republican Party members of the South Dakota House of Representatives
Women state legislators in South Dakota
Year of birth missing (living people)
21st-century American women